The 1972 United States presidential election in Idaho took place on November 7, 1972, as part of the 1972 United States presidential election. Idaho voters chose four representatives, or electors, to the Electoral College, who voted for president and vice president.

Idaho was won by incumbent President Richard Nixon (R–California), with 64.2 percent of the popular vote, against George McGovern (D–South Dakota), with 26.0% of the popular vote.

In a state that would reflect McGovern's national results, the Democratic nominee did not win a single county in Idaho. In fact, John G. Schmitz, running under the "American Independent" banner as a remnant of George Wallace's 1968 campaign, ran second ahead of McGovern in Fremont, Jefferson, Lemhi and Madison Counties. Although due to the salience of the civil rights issue there had occurred numerous cases of unpledged and "Dixiecrat" candidates receiving almost the entire vote of Deep Southern counties, and a smaller number in other antebellum slave states, Schmitz' performances in Jefferson County was the best by a third-party presidential candidate in any non-Southern county since 1936 when William Lemke reached over twenty-eight percent of the vote in the North Dakota counties of Burke, Sheridan and Hettinger. With 9.30% of the popular vote, Idaho would be Schmitz's strongest state in the 1972 election.

Nixon was the first Republican to sweep all Idaho's counties since Warren G. Harding in 1920, the first to carry Clearwater and Lewis Counties since Herbert Hoover in 1928, whilst the previous occasion the Republicans had won adjacent Nez Perce County was Dwight D. Eisenhower in 1952.

Results

Results by county

See also
 United States presidential elections in Idaho

Notes

References

Idaho
1972
1972 Idaho elections